Maria Teresa González Garza y Barrón is a professor and researcher in biotechnology at Monterrey Institute of Technology and Higher Education, Monterrey Campus. She holds a doctorate in biological sciences and microbiology.  Her specialties include cellular biology, molecular biology, cell therapy and ethnobiology. She performs her research with the Centro de Innovación y Transferencia en Salud and the Cátedra de Terapia Celular. She was part of a team which has had success in combating amyotrophic lateral sclerosis with stem cell therapy. Her research work has been recognized by Mexico's Sistema Nacional de Investigadores with Level II membership.

References

See also
List of Monterrey Institute of Technology and Higher Education faculty

Academic staff of the Monterrey Institute of Technology and Higher Education
Living people
Biotechnologists
Women biotechnologists
Year of birth missing (living people)